The 2002 Bridgestone Potenza 500 was the third round of the 2002 CART FedEx Champ Car World Series season, held on April 27, 2002, on the oval at Twin Ring Motegi in Motegi, Japan.

This marked the final Champ Car race for PacWest Racing. It also marked the final time Champ Car would compete in Japan as next years event was contested by the Indy Racing League.

Qualifying results

Race

Caution flags

Notes 

 Average Speed 155.447 mph

External links
 Qualifying Results
 Race Results

Bridgestone
Bridgestone
Indy Japan 300